Thinkmoney, stylised as thinkmoney, is a UK-based banking services provider that primarily offers current accounts for a fixed monthly fee with no overdraft or transaction charges. Thinkmoney's online system offers a budgeting service that sees customers money split into two accounts, one for spending and one for bills – an approach sometimes known as jam jar banking.

Thinkmoney's current account has received a four-star mark by the Fairbanking Foundation.

In 2012 customers of thinkmoney (then known as thinkbanking) were left without access to their money, due to a computer failure at Royal Bank of Scotland which it relies on for access to the payments infrastructure. A similar failure at RBS left some thinkmoney customers without access to their incomes again in June 2015.

See also
Managed account
List of companies based in Greater Manchester

References

External links 
 thinkmoney website

Online financial services companies of the United Kingdom